Ben Buraya Çıplak Geldim is the fifth album of Nil Karaibrahimgil, a female Turkish music singer-songwriter, released on 5 July 2012.

Mini clips 
Album is promoted by 1 minute mini-clips for 8 song in the album. First mini-clip is directed by Uğurcan Ataoğlu and Selin Akıncı for "He-Man" released on 29 May 2012. Second mini-clip is directed by Pelin Kırca for "Kazablanka" released on 30 May 2012. Third mini-clip is directed by Memed Erdener for "Kader Efendi" released on 31 May 2012. Fourth mini-clip is directed by Baran Baran for "Yürüdün mü?" released on 1 June 2012. Fifth mini-clip is directed by Aslı Yazıcıoğlu for "Ay Gız Uyan!" released on 2 June 2012. Sixth mini-clip is directed by Nermin Er for "Nesi Var?" released on 3 June 2012. Seventh mini-clip is directed by Selin Akıncı for "Allahımı Şaşırıcam" released on 5 June 2012. Eighth mini-clip is directed by Ali Taner Baltacı for "İstanbuldayım" released on 7 June 2012. The song was previously released for Pazarları Hiç Sevmem soundtrack on YouTube on 26 March 2012.

Track listing

Sales

References 

2012 albums
Nil Karaibrahimgil albums